In theoretical physics, a global anomaly is a type of anomaly: in this particular case, it is a quantum effect that invalidates a large gauge transformation that would otherwise be preserved in the classical theory. This leads to an inconsistency in the theory because the space of configurations which is being integrated over in the functional integral involves both a configuration and the same configuration after a large gauge transformation has acted upon it and the sum of all such contributions is zero and the space of configurations cannot be split into connected components for which the integral is nonzero.

Alternatively, the existence of a global anomaly implies that the measure of Feynman's functional integral cannot be defined globally.

The adjective "global" refers to the properties of a group that are detectable via large gauge or diffeomorphism transformations, but are not detectable locally via infinitesimal transformations. For example, all features of a discrete group (as opposed to a Lie group) are global in character.

A famous example is an SU(2) Yang–Mills theory in 4D with an odd number of chiral fermions in the fundamental representation 2 or the isospin 1/2 of SU(2), transforming as doublets under SU(2). This is known as the Witten SU(2) anomaly. 

Another new but much more subtle example is found in 2018, also for the SU(2) gauge theory in 4D, with an odd number of chiral fermions in the representation 4 or the isospin 3/2 of SU(2). This is known as the new SU(2) anomaly. The new SU(2) anomaly has an important application to rule out the existence of any global anomaly for the SO(10) grand unified theory. This new anomaly is a mixed gauge-gravitational anomaly and a nonperturbative global anomaly.

Many types of global anomalies must cancel for a theory to be consistent. An example is modular invariance, the requirement of anomaly cancellation for a part of a gravitational anomaly that deals with the large diffeomorphisms over two dimensional worldsheets of genus 1 or more.

References

Anomalies (physics)